The She-She-She Camps were camps for unemployed women that were organized by Eleanor Roosevelt (ER) in the United States as a counterpart to the Civilian Conservation Corps (CCC) programs designed for unemployed men. ER found that the men-only focus of the CCC program left out young women who were willing to work in conservation and forestry and to sign up for the six-month programs living away from family and close support. She lobbied for a sister organization to the CCC that would be for young women. Eleanor Roosevelt proposed that this would consist of camps for jobless women and residential worker schools. The She-She-She camps were funded by presidential order in 1933. Labor Secretary Frances Perkins championed one such camp after ER held a White House Conference for Unemployed Women on April 30, 1934, and subsequently ER's concept of a nationwide jobless women's camp was achieved. While the public largely supported the New Deal programs and the CCC was a huge success, the women's version barely topped 5,000 women annually by 1936 and overall served 8,500 as a result of ER's support.

Forestry and conservation 

President Franklin Roosevelt valued the CCC because it was fueled both by his passion for rural life and the philosophy of William James. James deemed this sort of program the "moral equivalent of war," channeling the passion for combat into productive service. Although administered by US Army officers, the camps were designed not to be militaristic since the Administration did not want any resemblance to the Hitler Youth of Germany. These tree armies kept the young male population occupied and engaged with conservation, fighting wildland fires, building dams and creating man-made lakes. Much of the state's parkland was improved even before the National Parks, but Eleanor Roosevelt asked, "What about the women?"

Camp TERA 

Criteria for participation in the women's camps were different from the CCC. Eleanor Roosevelt fought resistance from the administration, many of whom objected to sending America's unemployed women on what could be described as a government-sponsored vacation in the middle of a depression. ER was troubled by the plight of so many women, many of whom did not show up in the bread-lines but were relegated to living in subway tunnels and "tramping", foraging for subsistence outside urban areas. "As a group women have been neglected in comparison with others," the First Lady said, "and throughout this depression have had the hardest time of all." The number of women seeking jobs grew to two million by 1933. The feminist writer Meridel Le Sueur wrote that once out of work, women "will go for weeks verging on starvation, crawling in some hole, going through the streets ashamed, sitting in libraries, parks, going for days without speaking to a living soul like some exiled beast".

Hilda Worthington Smith, New Deal education specialist, went to work for FDR with experience at this, having established the Bryn Mawr Summer School for Working Women in 1921. It took several months but, with promotion and work, the first camp got off the ground at Bear Mountain's Camp TERA (Temporary Emergency Relief Assistance), later called Camp Jane Addams. Marian Tinker was selected as its first director. She had gone to High School in Manchester, Massachusetts, before completing her studies at Arnold College in New Haven, Connecticut and the University of Pennsylvania in Harrisburg. As a social worker, she was experienced at working with young women in various organizations like the YWCA and Girl Scouts, as well as several schools. Camp TERA began on June 10, 1933, with 17 young women from New York. Currently Bear Mountain State Park in New York, the site had 12 camps for CCC enrollees in 1934. FDR visited camp sp-20 that year to review the corps. He spent time at the recreation center, mess hall, barracks and camp library, praising the more than 200 enrollees for their hard work. Before leaving, he visited the signature project, a dam across the outlet of the Pine Meadow Valley that created the first of many swimming lakes for tourists, a direct expression of FDR's regard for conservation and forestry.

When ER first visited Camp TERA, she found only 30 girls at the 200-acre camp. Smith had planned for 20 girls to arrive twice a week until the capacity of 200 was met. However, massive red tape and confusion prevailed. ER appreciated the camp, but decided the requirements were too strict. She could not believe there were not enough women willing to accept the job and warned that the numbers had to increase or the idea might be abandoned. This put the State relief administration representative, Walter W. Petit, on the hot seat to explain why only 30 of the 700 women who had applied had been selected. Defending the "thorough" investigation needed some doing and while the program extended eligibility to age 40, blaming the "rigorousness of the qualifications for eligibility" did not absolve him of his part in delaying the project.  Despite the delays, mail supporting Camp TERA poured in to the White House with offers of more properties for the camps and pleas from individuals to attend. Government officials promised support for more camps if Camp TERA succeeded. There were also questions and media attention about the nature of the camps. Some of the women thought that the camp was intended for them to work at reforestation using manual labor and accordingly expected to be given hard work with little to show for it. With the dollar per day given the male enrollees holding back $22–25 of the monthly $30 for family back home, the offer of work was enticing to those who did not want to pass up the chance of job and with glowing reports coming back from participants, the proponents of She-She-She renewed efforts in the fall of 1933 to expand the program. But in the 1930s many Americans objected to the use of public resources to support individuals, especially women. Many considered that the role of the woman was in the home. Others considered the idea of putting women out in the woods to learn dubious skills just plain wrong.

Critics 
Men laboring in CCC camps were highly amused by the female counterpart.  Writing for a CCC newspaper, one noted how little work women at Camp TERA did, adding, "Some of the girls are pretty.  All are happy.  They say they may never want to go back to New York, from where they came.  Life has been tough for most of them." 
Pauli Murray, who would later become a lawyer, writer, black civil rights activist, and episcopal priest, arrived at Camp TERA on the advice of her doctor at the end of 1933. Living on the edge of poverty and diagnosed with pleurisy, she found her time there cut short after she clashed with the camp's director, Miss Mills. An ambulance driver during World War I and an authoritarian, Mills attempted to run the camp on semi-military lines. Murray had a copy of Das Kapital in her bags and when director Mills found it, she ejected her from the camp. Murray would later become a close friend of Eleanor Roosevelt. That leftist songs sung at camp sing-alongs became a focus of detractors. It was not surprising that there were leftists in the camps, given that they were not far removed from the "Hoovervilles", and the troubadour-style of fellow travelers like singer Woody Guthrie fueled these sing-alongs. It also was not surprising that in 1936 controversies over communist influences enveloped the camp. In July 1936, the American Legion of Rockland County accused Camp TERA officials of using Federal funding for communist purposes. The new Director, Bernice Miller, countered the charges, saying that  "the campers were permitted the completest freedom to say and discuss what they wanted, and sing any songs they wanted to". She also was quick to add that most supported the government. As to complaints of the Internationale and radical satires being sung, and that controversial material was being read, some, Miller admitted were "of communist and socialist persuasion". Also adding to embarrassment, women from Camp TERA "escaped" and visited a men's CCC camp nearby. A teacher at Camp TERA, Harry Gersh, commented, "It was a most unnatural environment for these women. No one had thought that sexual isolation would be a problem".

After returning home to New York City from Camp TERA, some of the women joined the radical Workers' Alliance. Spokeswoman for the organization Sarah Rosenberg, a vocal critic of the benefit of the She-She-She camps said, "More than one girl says there is nothing left except suicide or tramping on the roads".

Indigenous pride 

Over 90 camps were created across the U.S. by 1936, and over 8,500 women cycled through before they were closed. Each reflected the different cultures indigenous to their locations and depended heavily upon what was available in terms of local resources and talent. There are audio histories of communities cleaning old facilities and donating beds, clothes, food and other staples for the women. Many North Dakota Indian women left the reservation for the very first time to attend camp programs. Oberlin College welcomed stenographers and clerical workers at its Summer School for Office Workers. Barnard College in New York City hosted classes for unemployed unionized women. Black sharecropper women in the south studied at an agricultural college in Arkansas. The YWCA in Philadelphia provided a space for 40 women to study and live. Unemployed professional women in New Jersey attended a specially created program. In Michigan, rented houses provided unemployed women instruction in housekeeping skills. In the Ozarks, women attended literacy classes.

Details

The personal allowance for women was the same as that for men, $5 per month for personal needs in exchange for 56–70 hrs work per month on camp work projects. No remittance was sent back home as was the case for the CCC men's allowance. The camps were located where a facility had heat, lighting and sanitary conveniences—typically summer hotels, abandoned CCC camps and vacated schools. They were administered by female camp directors, project supervisors, staff teachers and counselors. The average camp had around 100 women, with a supervisory staff of 10–20 including cooks and a nurse. Each enrollee was assigned fixed hours of work on camp assignments, including working in forest nurseries at some camps. Other made and repaired toys and playground equipment, while some worked at creating visual training aids for public schools. Those with visual disabilities (there were camps for the blind) would make finished bedding or use natural materials to create woven products. Sewing equipment enabled the women to make their own clothing (one popular class was to make dresses from empty cloth feed bags) and no uniforms were required. WPA programs also supplied clothing, and canneries were used as teaching aids and product generation. Layettes and hospital sundries were made for public institutions and other WPA nursing projects. Maintenance of the barracks, housekeeping and kitchen duties along with instruction in economics and cooking were integral to the residential program, which lasted three to four months and was not subject to re-enrollment. The Native American women were paid an additional allotment to find rental housing and traveled with the men who went off the reservation to work. No camps were established exclusively for Native American men, so many traveled as a family group. Blacks were still segregated at this time but in their camps were given the same educational opportunities.

The educational program included English, adult education, domestic science, hygiene, public health, and economics. Games, athletic contests, hikes, music, and drama groups were included in the recreational plans and handicraft activities were encouraged. Some camps at schools had typing and secretarial classes. The cost per enrollee was estimated at $39 each, plus $5 which went to personal expenses. They worked to cover food costs (taken from the $5), lodging and medical care. The camps were operated on a year-round basis and eligibility for NYA (National Youth Administration) employment was a requirement. (The NYA took over from the TERA in 1936 in administering FERA (Federal Emergency Relief Administration)).

When the housing and shelter crisis eased in 1937, the NYA decided that the women's program was too costly and shut it down. Most of the women approved had led hard lives in the midst of the Depression and found the duties a relief from the meager sustenance in the cities, many embracing the outdoors with a vigor to match that of the young men working in the CCC camps.

The She-She-She camps for women closed October 1, 1937. The NYA (National Youth Administration) then in charge of the program, criticized the objectives and necessity of the camps and decided it was too expensive. As the crisis of hunger and shelter eased, the camp program for women could not be justified and it ended. Eleanor Roosevelt was never happy with either the women's or the men's camps. She objected to the military aspect of the CCC from the outset, but the success of the CCC and other New Deal programs left her with other anti-poverty programs and women-centered initiatives to pursue. Her vision was a two-year program for young men and women to be devoted to domestic projects such as conservation, health care, education and settlement houses. At the end of 1933, after Camp TERA was established, she had stated, "There is nothing more exciting than building a new social order."

References 
 PennPraxis, University of Pennsylvania. "New Deal Resident Camps for Unemployed Women".January 22, 2021
 Kahramanidis, Jane. "The She-She-She Camps of the Great Depression". History Magazine, February–March 2008, pp. 13–16.
 Cook, Blanche Wiesen. Eleanor Roosevelt: Volume Two, 1933–1938. New York: Viking Press, 1999, 88–91.
 Kennedy, David. Freedom From Fear: The American People in Depression and War, 1929–1945. New York: Oxford University Press, 1999, 144.
 New York Times - 16 August 1937

Great Depression
Social programs
New Deal
Labor rights
United States Department of Labor
Labour economics
1930s in women's history
Civilian Conservation Corps
Workers' education
National Youth Administration